Gehren is a town and a former independent municipality in the Ilm-Kreis district, in Thuringia, Germany. It is situated 7 km southeast of Ilmenau. It officially became a town in its own right ('Stadt') in 1855. However, since July 2018, it has been part of the town of Ilmenau. Between 1881 and 1998, Gehren was linked to Ilmenau by a railway.

The castle of Gehren burned down in 1936. Until 1920, Gehren was the capital of the Amt Gehren in the state of Schwarzburg-Sondershausen.

References

Ilm-Kreis
Schwarzburg-Sondershausen
Former municipalities in Thuringia